Near Death Experience is the fourth album by New York hardcore band Cro-Mags. It was released in 1993 on Century Media Records. In 2015, German record label Demons Run Amok Entertainment re-issued it on vinyl. It is, to date, the last album to feature vocalist John Joseph. Songs on the album deal with topics such as environmentalism, anti-abortion, and spirituality. After the release of this album, the Cro-Mags had gone on hiatus for some time, experienced more lineup changes, and would not release their next album, Revenge, until seven years later.

Track listing

Personnel 
John Joseph – lead vocals
Doug Holland – lead guitar
Gabby Abularach – rhythm guitar
Harley Flanagan – bass, backing vocals
Dave di Censo – drums

References 

Century Media Records albums
1993 albums
Cro-Mags albums
Demons Run Amok Entertainment albums